The United States ambassador to Moldova is the official representative of the president of the United States to the head of state of Moldova.

History
Until 1991, the Moldavian Soviet Socialist Republic had been a constituent SSR of the Soviet Union. Following the dissolution of the Soviet Union, the Supreme Soviet of the Moldavian SSR declared itself independent on August 27, 1991, and renamed itself the Republic of Moldova. The United States recognized Moldova on December 26, 1991,  and established diplomatic relations February 18, 1992. The U.S. embassy in Chişinău was established March 13, 1992, with Howard Steers as Chargé d’Affaires ad interim.

Ambassadors and chiefs of mission

See also
Embassy of Moldova in Washington, D.C.
Embassy of the United States, Chişinău
Moldova – United States relations
Foreign relations of Moldova
Ambassadors of the United States

References

United States Department of State: Background notes on Moldova

External links
 United States Department of State: Chiefs of Mission for Moldova
 United States Department of State: Moldova
 United States Embassy in Chinisau

Moldova
 
United States